Commins Coch is a small village on the A470 in the county of Powys in Wales. It is part of the Glantwymyn community.

Commins Coch is notable for the narrow bridge set at right angles that crosses the Afon Twymyn. The size and angle of the bridge restricts all traffic to crossing one vehicle at a time and it can be a serious problem for articulated lorries to cross.

Commins Coch is also the site of one of the 1970s holiday cottages allegedly burnt down by Meibion Glyndŵr during its campaign against English incomers. The cottage, now restored, can be seen on the right when leaving the village travelling East.

Previously served by Commins Coch Halt railway station on the Cambrian Line.

External links 
Photos of Commins Coch and surrounding area on geograph.org.uk

Villages in Powys